Chiusi-Chianciano Terme railway station (Stazione di Chiusi-Chianciano Terme) is a station in Chiusi, Tuscany, Italy. It also serves Chianciano Terme, hence the name. It is located on the Florence–Rome railway, at the junction with the line from Siena. Its buildings and infrastructure is managed by Rete Ferroviaria Italiana, which classified it in 2008 in the silver category.

History
 
The modest original station building, which was destroyed during the Second World War, was replaced by a modernist building at the end of the war, opened in 1947.

Buildings and infrastructure 
Within the Siena area, the station plays an important role, both for its strategic position at the junction between the two lines, and because it is connected with the Florence–Rome high-speed railway by the Chiusi North and Chiusi South interconnections.
 
All the regional trains on the Florence–Chiusi and Florence–Rome routes stop there (most of them run at regular intervals as a result of the progressive introduction of the Memorario timetable) and the regional trains to and from  terminate there; in addition, numerous long-distance trains stop, mostly Intercity services.
 
The station has seven platforms for passenger trains, plus many others reserved for the transit of goods and the storage of trains. Generally platforms 1 and 2 are used as terminus for the regional services of the line from Siena, while the platforms 3 and 4 are used by long-distance trains running on original Florence–Rome line, while the more remote platforms are used by other regional services that start or terminate.
 
The passenger building has a waiting room with ticket office, newsstand and information panels on arriving and departing trains, it is equipped with an underpass with new lifts to access the seven platform tracks. Furthermore, there is a large railway police station adjacent to the station building.

Station services 
The station is managed by RFI, which classified it in 2008 in the silver category. It has:
  ticket counter 
 accessibility for the handicapped
 bus terminus 
 bar
 passenger subway
 lifts
 newsstand
 toilets

References

Footnotes

Sources
 
 

Railway stations in Tuscany
Railway stations opened in 1862
Chiusi